The Silence is an Australian television film that first aired on ABC on 2 April 2006.

Synopsis
After being traumatised by a fatal shooting, Detective Richard Treloar is relegated to curating a police photographic exhibition at the Police Museum. He becomes obsessed by images of a murder victim and makes connections between a series of murder mysteries. When one of the leads is killed, the case is reopened and he becomes the prime suspect, as his life begins to unravel.

Cast
 Richard Roxburgh as Richard Treloar
 Essie Davis as Juliet Moore
 Alice McConnell as Helen Wilson
 Emily Barclay as Evelyn Hutchison
 Damian De Montemas as Michael Hanlon
 Tony Barry as Dennis Riordan
 Joel Tobeck as Ross Moss
 Firass Dirani as Anthony Vassalio
 Billie Rose Prichard

Reception

Critical reception
On review aggregator website Rotten Tomatoes, the film holds an approval rating of 50%, based on 6 reviews, with an average rating of 5/10.

Awards
The Silence won the Australian Screen Sound Guild award for Best Achievement in Sound for a Tele-Feature or Mini-Series.

It was nominated for an AFI Award for Best Telefeature or Mini Series,  Best Lead Actor in Television Drama for Richard Roxburgh and Best Guest or Supporting Actress in Television Drama for Emily Barclay.

It was also nominated at the 2007 Logie Awards for Silver Logie in Most Outstanding Drama Series, Miniseries or Telemovie. Richard Roxburgh was nominated for Most Outstanding Actor and Emily Barclay was nominated for Most Outstanding New Talent.

References

External links
 
 Screen Australia
 Australian Television Information Archive

2006 films
2000s crime films
2000s mystery films
Australian television films
Australian Broadcasting Corporation original programming
Films about police officers
Films directed by Cate Shortland
Australian crime films
2000s police procedural films